Bradley Davidson (born 17 May 1974) is an Australian basketball coach and former player who is currently an assistant coach on the men's basketball team at the University of Hawaiʻi at Mānoa. Prior to coaching, he played in Australia's National Basketball League (NBL).

Playing career 
Davidson played for the Townsville Crocodiles, Cairns Taipans, Hunter Pirates, Singapore Slingers, and Adelaide 36ers over thirteen seasons, finishing his career with a 40.1 three-point shooting percentage. He was also a member of the Australia men's national basketball team when they claimed the gold medal in the 2006 Commonwealth Games in Melbourne.

Coaching career 
After retiring from playing professional basketball, Davidson was named the head coach of the Premier League's West Adelaide Bearcats, and was also head coach of the Norwood Flames from 2011 to 2013. He was named the national shooting coach and talent identification manager for Basketball Australia's High Performance program in 2013, a role he held until 2016.

Davidson was named an assistant coach at North Dakota on October 15, 2016. He departed North Dakota in 2018 to accept an assistant coaching position at South Dakota, serving as the program's offensive coordinator.

Davidson was named an assistant coach at Hawaii on July 29, 2021.

References

External links 
 
 South Dakota Coyotes profile

1974 births
Living people
People from Mildura
Point guards
Townsville Crocodiles players
Cairns Taipans players
Hunter Pirates players
Singapore Slingers players
Adelaide 36ers players
Australian expatriate basketball people in the United States
North Dakota Fighting Hawks men's basketball coaches
South Dakota Coyotes men's basketball coaches
Hawaii Rainbow Warriors basketball coaches
Commonwealth Games gold medallists for Australia
Commonwealth Games medallists in basketball
Basketball players at the 2006 Commonwealth Games
Sportsmen from Victoria (Australia)
Medallists at the 2006 Commonwealth Games